FEFA (Serbian: ФЕФА / FEFA), officially Metropolitan University - FEFA (Serbian: Универзитет Метрополитан - ФЕФА / Univerzitet Metropolitan - FEFA), formerly known as Faculty of Economics, Finance and Administration as a part of Singidunum University is a faculty in Novi Beograd, Belgrade, Serbia. It has been founded in 2001, and while de facto remaining independent, it was initially a member of Singidunum University and now is a member of the Metropolitan University. This higher education institution received its accreditation certificate in 2008, as first economics and management school in the country to do so under rules established by new Law on Higher Education, renewing these certificates in 2014 and 2017.

Courses offered 

FEFA offers both undergraduate and graduate courses, in accordance with accreditation awarded by the Commission for Accreditation and Quality Assurance of the Republic of Serbia. Unlike other traditional European institutions, the school only offers a select number of programs. Degrees and study programs are compatible with Bologna process, aimed at making academic degree standards and quality assurance standards more comparable and compatible throughout Europe:

Bachelor's Degree (240 ECTS)

Economics
Audio-visual Production

Master's Degree (300 ECTS)

Economics
Digital Transformation
Creative Production

Ph.D. Studies (480 ECTS)

Business Economics

Research 

Faculty operates research institute with four independent research and consulting units, which engage both in academic and applied research, as well as in for-profit courses such as executive education or consultancy services:

Center for European Integration and Public Administration
Center for Financial Research and Corporate Consulting
Center for Advancement of Competitiveness
Center for Career Guidance and Counselling

Center for European Integration and Public Administration organizes an annual conference on European integration issues, on or around May 9 (at the occasion of Europe Day). In 2009, this center published a 64-researcher cost-benefit study on impact of Serbia's EU accession, in cooperation with Serbian Government and Serbian Chamber of Commerce.

International cooperation 

FEFA is an affiliate institution of the Harvard Business School (HBS) Institute for Strategy and Competitiveness, with teaching courses developed by HBS and hosting teleconferences by HBS Professors.

By way of European TEMPUS projects, FEFA cooperated with:

University of Belgrade, Serbia
Bielefeld University, Germany
Charles University, Czech Republic
University of Banja Luka, Bosnia & Herzegovina
University of Florence, Italy
University of Kragujevac, Serbia
Megatrend University, Serbia
University of Montenegro, Montenegro
New Bulgarian University, Bulgaria
University of Novi Sad, Serbia
Union University, Serbia
University of Valencia, Spain
Politechnic University of Valencia, Spain

References

External links 
  FEFA
  Metropolitan University

Universities and colleges in Serbia